.

Leonardo Marsili (1641–1713) was a Roman Catholic prelate who served as Archbishop of Siena (1682–1713).

Biography
Leonardo Marsili was born in Siena, Italy on 15 May 1641 and ordained a priest on 17 May 1665.
On 26 Jan 1682, he was appointed during the papacy of Pope Innocent XI as Archbishop of Siena.
In February 1682, he was consecrated bishop in Rome by Gasparo Carpegna, Cardinal-Priest of San Silvestro in Capite.
He served as Archbishop of Siena until his death on 8 Apr 1713 in Siena.

While bishop, he was the principal co-consecrator of Ulisse Giuseppe Gozzadini, Titular Archbishop of Teodosia (1700).

References

External links and additional sources
 (for Chronology of Bishops) 
 (for Chronology of Bishops) 

17th-century Italian Roman Catholic archbishops
18th-century Italian Roman Catholic archbishops
Bishops appointed by Pope Innocent XI
1641 births
1713 deaths